is a Japanese voice actress and singer from Gifu Prefecture. She began her voice acting career in 2014 and played her first major role in 2016 as the character Makina Nakajima in the anime series Macross Delta. She became part of the music group Walküre, which performs songs for the Macross franchise. She is also known for her roles as Satori Tamaba in Armed Girl's Machiavellism and Tsubasa Arihara in Hachigatsu no Cinderella Nine.

Biography
Nishida's interest in entertainment came at an early age, as she wanted to pursue a field that involved performing. She had also become interested in European children's literature such as Grimms' Fairy Tales and the work of Hans Christian Andersen. Due to her interest, she wanted to study in a country that served as the setting for European stories. She initially considered going to Germany, but due to a lack of available slots instead went to Denmark, where she studied for one year while in high school and learned Danish.

After returning to Japan, Nishida began considering pursuing a career in anime production. She had become a fan of anime and manga, but she mainly focused on characters and was not conscious of voice acting. While in her second year of university, a friend recommended that she watch the anime series Clannad. She was brought to tears by the series' plot and character expressions, which made her decide to pursue voice acting instead. Prior to debuting as a voice actress, she also performed as an idol in Akihabara under the name Nozomi Kayata.

Nishida debuted as a voice actress in 2014, playing the role of a female student in the anime series Invaders of the Rokujouma!?. The following year, she played her first named role, as Sarah in the anime series Absolute Duo. In 2016, she was cast as the character Makina Nakajima, a member of the music group Walküre in the anime series Macross Delta, and also became a part of the music group in real life. In 2017, she was cast as Satori Tamaba in Armed Girl's Machiavellism, and as Tsubasa Arihara, the protagonist of the mixed-media project Hachigatsu no Cinderella Nine. In 2018, she left her agency Atomic Monkey and, after a few months of freelancing, joined Mausu Promotion. In 2020, she reprised the role of Tsubasa for the anime adaptation of Hachigatsu no Cinderella Nine. She made her solo music debut with the release of the mini-album  on July 24, 2020.  On August 2, 2020, she left Mausu Promotion.

Filmography

Anime
2014
Invaders of the Rokujouma!? as Female student

2015
Absolute Duo as Sarah

2016
Macross Delta as Makina Nakajima
To Be Hero as Data Alien

2017
Armed Girl's Machiavellism as Satori Tamaba
The Silver Guardian as Farin
Grimoire of Zero as Magician E, Falling Witch
Black Clover as Amy

2018
March Comes in Like a Lion as Receptionist
Kokkoku: Moment by Moment as Friend's mother
Doreiku as Rushie Suginami
Kyōto Teramachi Sanjō no Holmes as Suzuka Ijima

2019
Hachigatsu no Cinderella Nine as Tsubasa Arihara
A Certain Scientific Accelerator as Yakumaru
Re:Stage! Dream Days as Kuroha Shirokita

2020
A Certain Scientific Railgun T as Yakumaru

2021
WIXOSS Diva(A)Live as Nana Nekozawa

Games
2016
Quiz RPG: The World of Mystic Wiz

2017
Hachigatsu no Cinderella Nine as Tsubasa Arihara
Re:Stage! Prism Step as Kuroha Shirokita

2018
Onsen Musume as Kurumi Tsukioka
Langrisser Mobile as Zerida

2019
Arknights as Ambriel
War of the Visions: Final Fantasy Brave Exvius as Kilphe (JP Version)

2022
Figure Fantasy
Langrisser Mobile as Sword of Light and Shadow

Discography

Mini album

References

External links
 

Japanese voice actresses
1990 births
Living people
Voice actresses from Gifu Prefecture
Musicians from Gifu Prefecture
21st-century Japanese actresses
21st-century Japanese women singers
21st-century Japanese singers